Lane County is the name of two counties in the United States:

 Lane County, Kansas 
 Lane County, Oregon